Kubel or Kübel is a German language occupational surname for a cooper or barrel maker. Notable people with the name include:
 Alfred Kubel (1909–1999), German politician
 Jason Kubel (born 1982), American former professional baseball player
 Karl Kübel (1909–2006), German entrepreneur, philanthropist and benefactor
 Lothar von Kübel (1823–1881), German Roman Catholic clergyman
 Nicolas Aubé-Kubel (born 1996), Canadian professional ice hockey right winger

References 

German-language surnames
Occupational surnames